"Wanna Go" is a song by the British rapper Maxsta, featuring vocals from Little Nikki. It was released on 29 September 2013, through Sony Music Entertainment. It entered the UK Singles Chart Update at number 40 and entered the official charts at number 43, managing to enter at number 8 in the R&B chart.

Music video
A music video to accompany the release of "Wanna Go" was first released onto YouTube on 6 August 2013 at a total length of four minutes and five seconds.

Track listing

Chart performance

Weekly charts

Release history

References

2013 singles
Sony Music UK singles
2013 songs
Little Nikki songs
Songs written by Little Nikki
Songs written by MNEK
British hip hop songs